Naomi Broady and Asia Muhammad were the defending champions, but Muhammad chose to participate at the 2019 FineMark Women's Pro Tennis Championship instead. 

Broady partnered alongside compatriot Heather Watson, and successfully defended their title, after Kristie Ahn and Alison Bai gave a walkover in the final.

Seeds

Draw

Draw

References
Main Draw

Fukuoka International Women's Cup - Doubles